Bourouba is a suburb of the city of Algiers in northern Algeria.

Notable people

References

Communes of Algiers Province